Arkadiusz Marek Ryś (born June 18, 1988) is a Polish footballer, currently plays for Garbarnia Kraków.

Career 
Who began his career at UKP Zielona Góra before moving to AJ Auxerre in June 2005, after four years left Rys the club had a trial with SO Châtellerault in July 2009 and signed later for GKS Katowice.

Position 
He plays as central defender or central midfielder.

References

External links
 Skynet
 Biography 

1988 births
Living people
AJ Auxerre players
GKS Katowice players
Polish footballers
Polish expatriate footballers
Expatriate footballers in France
Polish expatriate sportspeople in France
People from Zielona Góra
Sportspeople from Lubusz Voivodeship
Association football defenders